The 2018–19 Holy Cross Crusaders men's basketball team represented the College of the Holy Cross during the 2018–19 NCAA Division I men's basketball season. The Crusaders, led by fourth-year head coach Bill Carmody, played their home games at the Hart Center in Worcester, Massachusetts as members of the Patriot League. They finished the season 16–17, 6–12 in Patriot League play to finish in last place. They defeated Lafayette in the first round of the Patriot League tournament before losing to Bucknell in the quarterfinals.

Following the season, head coach Bill Carmody announced his retirement. On July 3, 2019, the school named Marquette assistant Brett Nelson as Carmody's replacement.

Previous season
The Crusaders finished the season 12–19, 8–10 in Patriot League play to finish in sixth place. In the Patriot League tournament, they defeated Navy in the quarterfinals before losing to Colgate in the semifinals.

Offseason

2018 recruiting class

2019 recruiting class

Roster

Schedule and results

|-
!colspan=9 style=|Non-conference regular season

|-
!colspan=9 style=|Patriot League regular season

|-
!colspan=9 style=| Patriot League tournament

References

Holy Cross Crusaders men's basketball seasons
Holy Cross
Holy Cross Crusaders men's basketball
Holy Cross Crusaders men's basketball